Faxonius quadruncus, the St. Francis River crayfish, is a species of crayfish in the family Cambaridae. It is endemic to Missouri. The common name refers to the St. Francis River where the first examples were found.

References

External links

Cambaridae
Fauna of the United States
Endemic fauna of Missouri
Freshwater crustaceans of North America
Crustaceans described in 1933
Taxobox binomials not recognized by IUCN